Joris Hébrard (born on  in Avignon) is a French politician. He is the mayor of Le Pontet, Vaucluse since 2015 and a Member of Parliament since 2022.

Biography 
Joris Hébrard born on 31 May 1982. He worked as a physiotherapist and continued to practice his profession after his election as mayor.

He was elected mayor of Le Pontet in the 2014 municipal elections: he received 42.62% of the votes in the second round.

In the departmental elections of March 2015, Joris Hébrard, in pairs with Danielle Brun, was elected departmental councillor of Vaucluse in the canton of Pontet with 53.7% of the votes in the first round.

He was the National Rally candidate in Vaucluse's 1st constituency at the 2022 French legislative election. He was elected in the second round.

References 
 This article is partly or entirely taken from the Wikipedia article entitled "Joris Hébrard".

1982 births
Living people
Mayors of places in Provence-Alpes-Côte d'Azur
People from Vaucluse

Deputies of the 16th National Assembly of the French Fifth Republic
National Rally (France) politicians
21st-century French politicians